Markham Stouffville Hospital is an acute care community hospital with two sites: the Markham site, with diagnostic and emergency services, and clinical programs in childbirth, children's health, surgery, medicine, cancer care and mental health; and the Uxbridge site, a 20-bed hospital offering some inpatient and emergency services. In the 2019-2020 fiscal year there were almost 20,000 inpatient stays with an average length of stay of 4.6 days, and 106,000 emergency department visits.

History
Opened in 1990, it was created to relieve stress on York Central Hospital in Richmond Hill and hospitals in the north part of Toronto. MSH is the only hospital in Markham and one of three in south York Region. It was one of a few Greater Toronto Area hospitals dealing with severe acute respiratory syndrome (SARS) patients.

In 2004, Uxbridge Cottage Hospital became a partner site with MSH.

In 2010, MSH became an affiliated and community teaching hospital linked with the University of Toronto's Faculty of Medicine.

The original complex was built by Mathers & Haldenby Architects and the current expansion by Bregman+Hamann and Perkins+Will.

Services

MSH is a popular hospital for ambulance re-directs from east-end Toronto hospitals with bed shortages.

Services provided at MSH:
 Acute Care
 Ambulatory Care
 Cardiorespiratory and Electrodiagnostics
 Cardiology 
 Emergency
 Maternal/Child System
 Mental Health/Inpatient Programs
 Mental Health/Outpatient Programs
 Nuclear Medicine
 Oncology
 Rehab, Palliative & Complex Care
 Surgery
 Ultrasound
 Physicians / Specialist Search
 Department of Family Practice Clinics
 Department of Laboratory Service Clinics
 Diagnostic System-PACS Clinics
Telemedicine
Ronald McDonald Family Room - opened 2013

Heliport
An original heliport was located at the east end of the hospital to facilitate medical airlifts to and from the hospital. Upon completion of the rebuilding of the hospital in 2014, the helipad is now on the roof of the new emergency wing and allows the transfer of patients directly into the hospital building. The new pad is an elevated octagon shaped pad which connects the roof of the hospital by a steel frame with a ramp to the entrance to the hospital. The relocation provides a safer landing area given that the old pad was next to public access roads around the rear of the hospital. The old pad site was removed (along with a Windsock nearby) during the re-development of the new Cornell Community Centre and used as a parking/storage space by construction crews.

Bus terminal

Markham Stouffville Hospital Terminal is a hub that connects to several YRT and Viva bus routes, and is the easternmost transit terminal in York Region. It was partly replaced by Cornell Terminal upon its opening in 2022.

Routes 

Markham Stouffville Hospital connects to the following bus routes:

 Viva Purple
 YRT 1 Highway 7
 YRT 9 9th Line
 YRT 16 16th Avenue
 YRT 303 Bur Oak Express
 YRT 411 Markham District H.S.
 YRT 522 Markham Community Bus

References

Hospital buildings completed in 1990
Hospitals in the Regional Municipality of York
Hospitals established in 1990
Buildings and structures in Markham, Ontario
Heliports in Ontario
Eberhard Zeidler buildings
Certified airports in Ontario
1990 establishments in Ontario